Dóra Madarász (born 3 September 1993) is a Hungarian table tennis player. She competed in the 2020 Summer Olympics.

References

External links
 

1993 births
Living people
People from Kecskemét
Table tennis players at the 2020 Summer Olympics
Hungarian female table tennis players
Olympic table tennis players of Hungary
European Games competitors for Hungary
Table tennis players at the 2015 European Games
Table tennis players at the 2019 European Games
Sportspeople from Bács-Kiskun County